Kazimierz Polok (11 February 1937 – 5 May 1993) was a Polish footballer. He played in five matches for the Poland national football team from 1961 to 1963.

References

External links
 

1937 births
1993 deaths
Polish footballers
Poland international footballers
Place of birth missing
Association footballers not categorized by position